Aliabad (also Romanized as ‘Alīābād; also known as Ali Abad Rastagh and Hājīābād) is a village in Rostaq Rural District, in the Central District of Saduq County, Yazd Province, Iran. At the 2006 census, its population was 12, in 8 families.

References 

Populated places in Saduq County